Lorenzo Crocetti (born 20 September 1983) is an Italian footballer who plays as a forward for Montalcino .

Biography
Born in Bagno a Ripoli, the Province of Florence, Tuscany, Crocetti started his career at Florence club AC Fiorentina. Crocetti made his Serie A debut in the last round of 2001–02 Serie A, on 5 May, against Perugia. Crocetti was the starting forward. He was substituted by Filippo Fedeli at half time. At the end of season Fiorentina bankrupted.

On 31 August 2002, Crocetti joined Serie B club Perugia on free transfer. He played twice for the first team, in the last few rounds of 2002–03 Serie B.

From 2003 he spent the next 10 seasons in Italian Lega Pro as well as in Swiss Challenge League and 1. Liga Classic.

Crocetti was transferred to the third division club Vis Pesaro in mid-2003 in co-ownership deal. Vis Pesaro bought the remaining 50% registration rights of Crocetti in June 2004 but re-sold Crocetti to Cittadella soon after.

Crocetti joined Pergocrema in August 2005, for €400,000. He spent 5 seasons in Pergoletto including periods of loan. Crocetti scored 16 goals in 2005–06 Serie C2, as the joint-second in the group A of the fourth division. (another was Roberto Barbieri)

In January 2010 he left for Bassano in temporary deal. He was signed outright at the end of the season. However, in January 2011, after the club signed Cristian Longobardi, Crocetti left the club in another temporary deal. Both Crocetti and Longobardi were the team top-scorer of 5 goals only that season. Crocetti was the third scorer for Lucchese, behind Alessandro Marotta and Luigi Grassi. However, in term of goal per game (0.50) he was the first in the squad.

On 13 February 2012, he was signed by FC Lugano.

After one and a half years in Switzerland, Crocetti returned to Italian football for San Marinese club San Marino Calcio.

On 31 August 2014, Crocetti moved to recently reformed Serie D team Siena.

International career
Crocetti was a member of Italy youth teams. He was in the squad for 2000 UEFA European Under-16 Football Championship qualification (now renamed to under-17 event).

References

External links
Lega Serie A profile 
AIC profile (data by football.it) 
Lorenzo Crocetti at Footballdatabase

1983 births
Living people
People from Bagno a Ripoli
Association football forwards
Italian footballers
ACF Fiorentina players
A.C. Perugia Calcio players
Vis Pesaro dal 1898 players
A.S. Cittadella players
U.S. Pergolettese 1932 players
S.S.D. Pro Sesto players
S.S.D. Varese Calcio players
Bassano Virtus 55 S.T. players
S.S.D. Lucchese 1905 players
Casale F.B.C. players
FC Lugano players
A.S.D. Victor San Marino players
Serie A players
Serie B players
Serie C players
Swiss Challenge League players
Italy youth international footballers
Italian expatriate sportspeople in Switzerland
Expatriate footballers in Switzerland
Sportspeople from the Metropolitan City of Florence
Footballers from Tuscany